Kulp may refer to:

Places
 Kulp, Turkey, Ottoman Qulb, in Diyarbakır Province, Turkey
 Tuzluca, Kurdish Qulp, currently in Iğdır Province (Kars province prior to 1993), Turkey

Other uses
 Kulp (surname)
 Kulp (band), Turkish 
 KULP, radio station in El Campo, Texas

See also
Culp